Euphorbia mangelsdorffii is a species of plant in the family Euphorbiaceae. It is endemic to Madagascar.  Its natural habitats are subtropical or tropical moist lowland forests and subtropical or tropical moist montane forests. It is threatened by habitat loss.

References

Endemic flora of Madagascar
mangelsdorffii
Vulnerable plants
Taxonomy articles created by Polbot